Alphamethadol (INN), or α-methadol, also known as alfametadol, is a synthetic opioid analgesic. It is an isomer of dimepheptanol (methadol), the other being betamethadol (β-methadol). Alphamethadol is composed of two isomers itself, L-α-methadol, and D-α-methadol. The former compound, L-α-methadol, is an important active metabolite of levacetylmethadol (LAAM), an opioid substitute drug that is used clinically. Both of alphamethadol's isomers bind to and activate the μ-opioid receptor and are active as opioid analgesics, similarly to those of alphacetylmethadol (α-acetylmethadol).

Legal status

Australia
Alphamethadol is considered a Schedule 9 prohibited substance in Australia under the Poisons Standard (February 2017). A Schedule 9 substance is a substance which may be abused or misused, the manufacture, possession, sale or use of which should be prohibited by law except when required for medical or scientific research, or for analytical, teaching or training purposes with approval of Commonwealth and/or State or Territory Health Authorities.

See also 
 Dimepheptanol
 Betamethadol
 Alphacetylmethadol

References 

Secondary alcohols
Dimethylamino compounds
Analgesics
Mu-opioid receptor agonists
Synthetic opioids